The Rugby League Divisional Premiership (sometimes called the Second Division Premiership) was a competition for British rugby league clubs in the Second Division of the Rugby Football League, which operated between 1986 and 1997.

History
The Second Division Premiership was introduced during the 1986–87 season. The format was the same as the Premiership competition used for First Division clubs, with the teams finishing in the top eight in the league competing in an end-of-season knockout tournament. The final was staged at Old Trafford as a curtain raiser for the First Division Premiership final, with the man of the match being awarded the Tom Bergin Trophy.

When a Third Division was introduced in the 1991–92 season, the competition was renamed the Divisional Premiership, and was expanded to include both Second and Third Division teams. The competition returned to the previous format when the league reverted to two divisions in the 1993–94 season.

Following the switch to summer rugby, a shortened four-team format was used for the 1996 competition. In 1998, the competition was replaced by a play-off system which would determine promotion to the Super League. The Tom Bergin Trophy continued to be used as the Grand Final's man of the match award.

Divisional Premiership winners

See also
Championship Grand Final

Notes

References
  

Rugby league competitions in the United Kingdom
1986 establishments in the United Kingdom
1997 disestablishments in the United Kingdom
Divisional Premiership
Recurring sporting events established in 1986